Silvius pollinosus is a species of horse fly in the family Tabanidae.

Distribution
United States

References

Tabanidae
Insects described in 1880
Diptera of North America
Taxa named by Samuel Wendell Williston